Bradford Interchange is a transport interchange in Bradford, West Yorkshire, England, which consists of a railway station and bus station adjacent. The Interchange, which was designed in 1962, was hailed as a showpiece of European design and was opened on 14 January 1973. It is served by the majority of bus services in the city centre, while the railway station, which is one of two in the city centre (along with  ), is served by Northern and is also the terminus for Grand Central services from London King's Cross.

Layout and facilities

The main entrance with the taxi rank and car park is on a lower level, while the train platforms and bus stops are on a split upper level, both separate with pedestrian access. Downstairs, in the central concourse, there are a few shops, a newsagent, a cafe and sandwich shop and a fast food outlet on the train platforms, where hot drinks are also available. Toilets are located off the main concourse.

There is also a British Transport Police office and lost luggage desk, provided for passengers' concern and safety at the railway station, with a separate security and lost-luggage unit for bus travellers, on the bus concourse. A smoking ban is observed in all parts of Bradford interchange, and CCTV is also in operation with security officers and police regularly patrolling the station.

The railway station has four platforms and a short bay that was previously used for the Red Star parcels facility. Platform 1 has a run-round facility for locomotive-hauled trains (mainly freight services). The track layout and associated signalling was remodelled during the course of a week-long engineering blockade from 25 October to 3 November 2008, to permit higher speeds on both routes into the station, and also allow trains to approach the station from both Leeds and Halifax simultaneously (something that was not possible with the old track configuration).

All tracks run south out of the station about 600m to the Mill Lane junction where the westbound and eastbound routes separate. Originally it was possible for trains on the Calder Valley line to bypass the station, but that possibility was removed when the diversionary track was lifted.

Ticket offices
Bradford Interchange has separate bus and train ticket outlets. The bus and Metro office, which also deals with National Express coach enquiries from a separate desk, is located on the bus departure concourse. The train ticket office is next to the pedestrian entrance to the train platforms and is open seven days a week (except for late evenings).  Escalators and lifts link the two levels and there is step-free access to all platforms.

History

The original railway station, named Bradford Exchange, was opened by the joint efforts of the Lancashire and Yorkshire Railway and the Great Northern Railway on 9 May 1850. In 1867, the Leeds, Bradford and Halifax Junction Railway, which had previously used Bradford Adolphus Street, built a link to the tracks into Exchange station to join the two existing companies; Adolphus Street station was then closed to passenger use.

The railway station was completely rebuilt on the same site in 1880 with ten bay platforms and two arched roofs. Constructed of wrought iron, these rested at the outer sides on plain stone walls and classical corinthian style columns down the middle. Glass covered the middle half and timber (inside)/ slate (outside) covered the outer quarters of each span. The four end screens were glazed in a fan pattern with decorative timber outer edging. The railway station never had a formal frontage; instead, passengers entered by an opening in the northwest side.

In its 1920s heyday, it served routes to  via Ardsley (used by many of the city's through trains to London King's Cross),  via  and Ossett,  & Halifax via Queensbury,  via Cleckheaton (the Spen Valley Line) and to Leeds via the Pudsey Loop in addition to the current lines. These however had all closed by the end of 1966 - most having fallen victim to the Beeching Axe.

By 1973, the railway station with its 10 platforms was deemed too large and was again rebuilt, this time on a different site slightly further south. The old Exchange station was demolished soon afterwards and was used for a time as a car park; the site now houses the Bradford Law Courts and is due to be developed as a 'Justice Quarter' with new magistrates' and coroner's courts. In 1977, a bus station was built alongside, and, in 1983, the station was renamed Bradford Interchange to link buses and trains in a covered environment.

The bus station featured a large ridge and furrow design of overall roof, which was subsequently demolished in 1999 to allow for a rebuilding of the bus station, which was opened in 2001. This was paid for partly by the sale of some adjacent land to the south of the site and some now-surplus land on the old bus station site.
During the 1970s and 1980s, the station was considered the mainline station for Bradford with express services to London King's Cross, Trans-Pennine services to Liverpool and Newcastle and summer Saturday services to the South-West. The Inter-city services were moved to Forster Square station in 1992 when the line was electrified. The station also had an adjacent Red Star Parcels terminus but, like most other mainline stations following the privatisation of British Rail, it lost this facility during the 1990s.

Services

Bus
The bus station is managed by Metro. The main operators at the bus station include First West Yorkshire and Arriva Yorkshire with other services run by The Keighley Bus Company and TLC Travel. The Flyer service operates to Leeds Bradford Airport, Otley and Harrogate. 

Local bus services run to many destinations, including Dewsbury, Halifax, Harrogate, Huddersfield, Ilkley, Keighley, Leeds, Otley and Wakefield, as well as services within the Bradford area, such as Shipley.

National Express Coaches and Megabus run nationwide from Bradford but no longer from the interchange, they stop at a bus stop on nearby Nelson Street.  Bharat Coaches used to run coach services to Derby, Leicester, Slough and Southall.

Rail

Bradford Interchange is on the Caldervale Line and is one of the two railway stations serving the city of Bradford. The other station is Forster Square, a 10 minute walk away.

Monday to Saturday during the daytime, services run every 15 minutes between the Interchange and Leeds and hourly onwards to both York and Hull (the latter introduced at the winter 2019 timetable change). On evenings and Sundays, there are usually three services to Leeds each hour with one extended to both York and Hull (though the latter doesn't run on Sundays).

Sundays, there are three services each hour to Halifax - these continuing to one of Manchester Victoria, Blackpool North via Preston or Huddersfield (hourly to each).

Because of the geography of Bradford, the station was built as a terminus, with the lines in a 'Y'-formation, so trains must reverse out of the station to continue their journey.

London services
The station now also sees regular services to London King's Cross via Low Moor, Halifax, Brighouse, Mirfield, Wakefield, Pontefract and Doncaster. In January 2009, Grand Central had its application for train paths to run a Bradford Interchange to London service accepted by the Office of Rail Regulation. Four trains per day operate, now that full approval for the service has been granted; these use Class 180 units and started running from 23 May 2010.

Ongoing improvements

The bus stands were once more plentiful and originally featured a large 'ridge and furrow' glass roof, but this was demolished in the 1990s, following the sale of some land for an office development. The bus station was completely rebuilt in 2001.

Metro are currently considering improvements to the bus and rail platforms, including better access between facilities and pedestrian access between the bus concourse and the rail platforms, to save walking down and up the escalators.

The information displays were replaced in early 2009, following a modest facelift in autumn 2008, which included new signage and a repaint. In January 2010, automatic ticket barriers were installed by Northern Rail.

Further improvements under the National Station Improvement Plan are proposed, which include refurbished canopies, new flooring, more lighting and CCTV, a new waiting room and extra seating.

Under Network Rail's Northern Hub development, the Northern franchise, which commenced in April 2016, will reintroduce services to Liverpool and new services to  via Sheffield, Manchester Airport and Chester have been announced.  These form part of the "Northern Connect" network and use Class 195s that were delivered in 2018.

Network Rail upgraded the track and signalling infrastructure on the Calder Valley line in October 2018. The same scheme has also seen track and line speed improvements carried out, in order to reduce journey times to Manchester and Preston.

Network Rail and Transport for North are currently working on plans for a high-speed rail stop in Bradford either in the city centre or a parkway station. This has been campaign as part of the Northern Powerhouse Rail Project.

In March 2021, as part of the Northern Powerhouse Rail scheme it was announced that should the Government back the route via Bradford, that a new station would be built replacing the existing Bradford Interchange. The new Saint James station would be sited on top of the current Saint James's Market.

See also
 Bradford Crossrail

References

External links

Disused Stations: Bradford Exchange
Metro: Bradford Interchange
8 o'clock special with a view of the Bradford Exchange 10 years before its closure

Railway stations in Bradford
DfT Category C1 stations
Buildings and structures in Bradford
Transport in Bradford
Bus stations in West Yorkshire
Railway stations in Great Britain opened in 1973
Railway stations opened by British Rail
Railway stations served by Grand Central Railway
Northern franchise railway stations